Edgemont Park may refer to:

Edgemont Park, Michigan 
Edgemont Park, Montclair, New Jersey
Edgemont Park, Alabama in Jefferson County, Alabama

See also
 Edgemont (disambiguation)